Chengdu Hunters is a Chinese professional Overwatch esports team based in Chengdu, Sichuan. The Hunters compete in the Overwatch League (OWL) as a member of the league's East region. The team is owned by Huya, Inc., a Chinese interactive broadcast platform and was operated by Royal Never Give Up (RNG) throughout the 2019 and 2020 OWL seasons. The Hunters also formerly had partnership with Overwatch Contenders the team LGE.Huya to act as the team's academy team. Founded in 2018, Chengdu Hunters began play as one of eight expansion teams in 2019 and is one of four professional Overwatch teams in China. Since inception, the Hunters have qualified for the season playoffs once, in 2021.

Franchise history

OWL expansion 
On September 7, 2018, Activision Blizzard announced that domestic game livestream platform Huya, Inc. had purchased an expansion team based in Chengdu, later revealed as Chengdu Hunters, for the Overwatch League's second season. While the team was owned by Huya, they would be operated by Chinese esports organization Royal Never Give Up. The Hunters signed an all-Chinese roster and staff, aside from two Taiwanese members, which would be led by head coach Wang "RUI" Xingrui.

Early years: 2019–present 

Chengdu's first ever regular season OWL match was a 3–2 victory over the Guangzhou Charge on February 15, 2019. After posting three consecutive 3–4 records for the first three stages of the season, the Hunters failed to qualify for any of the stage playoffs. Chengdu finished the regular season with a 13–15 record and qualified for the play-in tournament. However, they were eliminated in the first round of the play-in tournament after a loss to the Guangzhou Charge.

In the offseason preceding the 2020 season, head coach Wang "RUI" Xingrui announced that he would be stepping down from his position due to health issues. The Hunters promoted assistant coach Chang "Ray" Chia-Hua and signed former LGE.Huya head coach Wu "Dokkaebi" Xiuqing as the team's new co-head coaches. Chengdu made several roster changes prior to the season, including officially signing rookie Xin "Leave" Huang. Due to the COVID-19 pandemic, the Hunters were not able to play their first match of the season several months after the season officially began. Prior to the final midseason tournament of the season, the Countdown Cup, Chen Murong was signed as the team's new co-head, replacing Wu "Dokkaebi" Xiuqing. Chengdu finished the season in sixth, out of seventh, place in the league's Asia region, with an effective 8–14 record. The Hunters defeated the London Spitfire in the first round of the Asia play-in tournament; however, they lost to the New York Excelsior in the following round, ending their season.

Entering the 2021 season, Xingrui "RUI" Wang was brought back as the team's new head coach. The Hunters six players in the offseason, all of whom were rookies. Additionally, the Hunters ended their partnership with Royal Never Give Up, who had been operating the team since its inception. The Hunters qualified for three of the league's four midseason tournaments, reaching the finals twice, but they failed to secure a title in any of them. At the end of the regular season, Huang "Leave" Xin won the season's Most Valuable Player award. Chengdu had their best regular season finish in franchise history, placing as the third seed in the season playoffs. They defeated the Atlanta Reign in the first round of the double-elimination tournament. However consecutive losses to the Dallas Fuel and San Francisco Shock ended their playoff run.

Team identity 
On November 12, 2018, the Chengdu Hunters brand was officially unveiled. The team name was chosen "as a symbol of the team’s dedication to
pursuing the honor of the league." The logo, a black and gold giant panda, was chosen because "it is the national treasure of China, the symbol of Chengdu, and a symbol of peace and good luck. At the same time, the panda also boasts powerful fighting strength and represents the Chinese spirit of perseverance, and collectively with the team’s name, represents the team’s determination to achieve victory." The colors represent vigor and steadiness, and contain the main colors of Huya and NRG, meant to represent the collaboration of the two companies.

Personnel

Current roster

Head coaches

Awards and records

Seasons overview

Individual accomplishments 
Season MVP
Leave (Xin Huang) – 2021

Role Star selections
Leave (Xin Huang) – 2021

All-Star Game selections
Yveltal (Li Xianyao) – 2019
Ameng (Menghan Ding) – 2019, 2020
JinMu (Yi Hu) – 2019

Academy team

On January 27, 2019, LinGan e-Sports Club announced their partnership with the Chengdu Hunters and became the academy team. LinGan e-Sports changed the name of their Overwatch team to LGE.Huya.

References

External links 

 
Esports teams based in China
Overwatch League teams
Esports teams established in 2018
2018 establishments in China
Royal Never Give Up